The 8th Maneuver Division (hanja: 八機動師團), also known as Roly Poly Toy Division, is a military formation of the Republic of Korea Army and is unit is one of four divisions under the command of the VII Maneuver Corps. Before the unit was renamed on January 1, 2021, it was called the 8th Mechanized Infantry Division.

History
The unit initially comprised the 10th, 16th and 21st Regiments. The 16th Infantry Regiment was originally activated as the 16th Regiment on October 28, 1948, at Masan and was first commanded by Lt. Col. Park Shi Ch'ang.

The 8th Infantry Division was activated as the 8th Division on June 20, 1949 at Gangneung and was first commanded by Brig. General Lee Hyong Kun. The unit originally comprised the 10th and 21st Regiments.

Following its activation the 8th Division was positioned near the 38th parallel.

On 1 December 2011, 8th Infantry Division has finished the switch to mechanized infantry.

On 1 December 2016, 8th Mechanized Infantry Division was reassigned from V Corps to VII Corps in order to prepare for future reorganization.

On 30 November 2018, 8th Mechanized Infantry Division was consolidated with 26th Mechanized Infantry Division. Although 8th Division retained its name, its original subordinate forces were either dissolved or replaced.

On 1 January 2021, the 8th Mechanized Infantry Division was renamed the 8th Maneuver Division.

Korean War
It became part of I Corps after the first fall of Seoul. Was part of the defensive line to slow the North Korean advance from Seoul to Taejon. Fought in the Battle of Pusan Perimeter.

Supporting the Eighth United States Army advance towards China, the 24th Division and the attached British 27th Brigade positioned on the left, proceeded to the Chongchon; the ROK II Corps, with the ROK 1st Division, advanced on the right. To the east the 8th Division reached Tokchon, forty miles north of Pyongyang, during the night of October 23, and then turned north and arrived at Kujang-dong on the Chongchon River, about ten miles from Tokchon, two days later. After the Chinese intervention in the war, Chinese troops broke the defences of its 16th Regiment during the battle on October 31, 1950.

After the Chinese intervention and attacks in November 1950, the division was among five allied formations (including the ROK 6th, 7th, and 8th Divisions) that the U.S. Army judged 'were shattered units that would need extensive rest and refitting to recover combat effectiveness.'

Current disposition
December 1, 2011, 8th Infantry Division has finished the switch to mechanized infantry; and is previously part of the combined divisions of the U.S. and South Korean forces, the wartime command was the 2nd Infantry Division of the U.S. Army. December 1, 2016, 8th Mechanized Infantry Division was reassigned from V Corps to VII Corps in order to prepare for future reorganization.
November 30, 2018, 8th Mechanized Infantry Division was consolidated with 26th Mechanized Infantry Division. Although 8th Division retained its name, its original subordinate forces were either dissolved or replaced. On 1 January 2021, the 8th Mechanized Infantry Division was renamed the 8th Maneuver Division.

 Headquarters:
 Engineer Battalion
 Intelligence Battalion
 Support Battalion
 Armored Reconnaissance Battalion
 Medical Battalion
 Signal Battalion
 CBR Battalion
 Air Defense Battalion
 Military Police Battalion
 Replacement Company
 Headquarters Company
 1st Mechanized Infantry Brigade (known as Cavalry Brigade, formerly under Capital Mechanized Infantry Division)
1st Brigade Headquarters and Headquarters Company
101st Mechanized Infantry Battalion (K21)
122nd Mechanized Infantry Battalion (K21)
137th Mechanized Infantry Battalion (K200A1)
Support Battalion
 60th Mechanized Infantry Brigade (formerly under 20th Mechanized Infantry Division)
60th Brigade Headquarters and Headquarters Company
26th Tank Battalion (K2)
32nd Tank Battalion (K2)
107th Mechanized Infantry Battalion (K21)
Support Battalion
 73rd Mechanized Infantry Brigade (formerly under 26th Mechanized Infantry Division)
73rd Brigade Headquarters and Headquarters Company
57th Tank Battalion (K1A2)
123rd Mechanized Infantry Battalion (K21)
125th Mechanized Infantry Battalion (K200A1)
Support Battalion
 Division Artillery Brigade
Division Artillery Brigade Headquarters and Headquarters Battery
50th Artillery Battalion (K-55A1 155 mm)
95th Artillery Battalion (K9 155 mm)
228th Artillery Battalion (K9 155 mm)
231st Artillery Battalion (K-55A1 155 mm)

Unit of the VII Maneuver Corps 
Capital Mechanized Infantry Division
2nd Quick Response Division
11th Maneuver Division

See also 
Republic of Korea Army

References

InfDiv0008
InfDiv0008SK
Military units and formations established in 1949
Yangju